Marcus Cable Company was an American cable television provider headquartered in Dallas, Texas, and founded by Jeffrey A. Marcus and the Milwaukee-based Marcus Corporation. It was the nation's largest closely held cable-television company and the ninth largest over all, with 1.1 million customers in 18 states, with its principal markets in Wisconsin, southern California, Alabama, Indiana, Tennessee, and Fort Worth, Texas. In 1995, Marcus acquired the cable assets of Sammons Communications, which was also based in Dallas, for $1 billion. In April 1998, entrepreneur Paul Allen purchased Marcus Cable for $2.775 billion through his investment arm Vulcan Ventures. In February 1999, Marcus Cable was merged with Vulcan's Charter Communications.

References

Mass media companies established in 1982
1982 establishments in Texas
Mass media companies disestablished in 1999
1999 disestablishments in Texas
1995 mergers and acquisitions
1999 mergers and acquisitions
Cable television companies of the United States
Defunct companies based in Texas
Companies based in Dallas